Huayan Temple, may refer to:

 Huayan Temple (Datong), in Datong, Shanxi, China
 Huayan Temple (Meishan) in Renshou, Meishan, Sichuan, China
 Huayan Temple (Ningde), in Ningde, Fujian, China

Buddhist temple disambiguation pages